Rayyah Balak "(Put your mind at ease)" is a song recorded by the Lebanese star Amal Hijazi in 2000 and released as a single in 2001. The song was a considerable success in its native Lebanon and also managed to reach the number one spot in a number of countries such as Egypt, Syria, Jordan and Morocco.

2001 singles
Amal Hijazi songs
2000 songs